The World Museum of Mining is a museum and memorial in Butte, Montana.

Chartered in 1964 as a non-profit educational corporation, the Museum first opened its doors in July 1965. The site, an inactive silver and zinc mine named the Orphan Girl, includes 50 buildings on some 22 acres of land. Copper and zinc were the most common ores found in this mine.

References

External links
 World Museum of Mining

Mining museums in Montana
Museums in Butte, Montana
History museums in Montana
1964 establishments in Montana
Open-air museums in the United States